The 19th Annual Kolkata Film Festival was held on 10 to 17 November 2013. The Kolkata International Film Festival (KIFF) is an annual film festival held in Kolkata, West Bengal, India. The 19th KIFF was inaugurated by Mr. Amitabh Bachchan on 10 November and was attended by a host of luminaries including Shah Rukh Khan - also the state's brand ambassador as well as actor Kamal Haasan in the presence of Mamata Banerjee who is the current Chief Minister of West Bengal.

Categories

Inaugural Film
Centenary Tribute
Great Master
Homage
Retrospective
New Horizon
Focus : South East Asia
100 Years of Indian cinema
Special Tribute
Cinema International
Shades of black and white
Special Screening
Asian Select DreamZ The Movie directed by Sumana Mukherjee 
Indian Select
Children Screening
Golden Jubilee
Student Shorts

References

External links

Kolkata Film Festival website

2013 film festivals
2013 festivals in Asia
2013 in Indian cinema
2010s in Kolkata
November 2013 events in India
2013
Kolkata International Film Festival